Bob Hewitt and Frew McMillan did not defend their title as they participated in the Wimbledon boycott of 1973.

Jimmy Connors and Ilie Năstase defeated John Cooper and Neale Fraser in the final, 3–6, 6–3, 6–4, 8–9(3–7), 6–1 to win the gentlemen's doubles title at the 1973 Wimbledon Championships.

Seeds

  Jimmy Connors /  Ilie Năstase (champions)
  John Cooper /  Neale Fraser (final)
 n/a
  Sergei Likhachev /  Alex Metreveli (third round)

Draw

Finals

Top half

Section 1

Section 2

Bottom half

Section 3

Section 4

References

External links

1973 Wimbledon Championships – Men's draws and results at the International Tennis Federation

Men's Doubles
Wimbledon Championship by year – Men's doubles